Rehoboam (French name: réhoboam) was a UK bottle size for wine and champagne.

Also refer Wine bottle sizes.

Definition 

6 reputed quart.

Conversion 

1 rehoboam = 6 reputed quarts

1 rehoboam = 1 UK gal 

1 rehoboam  = 0.004546092 m3

Other uses
In the 1849 novel Shirley by Charlotte Brontë, chapters 1 and 17, the clergyman Mr Helstone is described as wearing a "Rehoboam, or shovel hat".

References

Units of volume
Customary units of measurement